2672 km is a rural locality (a railway station) in Kamyshlovskoye Rural Settlement of Lyubinsky District, Russia. The  population was 77 as of 2010.

Streets 
 Kalinina
 Rabochaya
 Tsentralnaya

References 

Rural localities in Omsk Oblast